The 2003–04 season was the Persepolis's 3rd season in the Pro League, and their 21st consecutive season in the top division of Iranian Football. They were also be competing in the Hazfi Cup. Persepolis was captained by Afshin Peyrovani.

Squad
As of October 2003.

Transfers

In

Out

Technical staff

|}

Competition record

Iran Pro League

Standings

Competitions

Iran Pro League

Hazfi Cup

Persepolis 5–3 Payam on aggregate.

Esteghlal Ahvaz 4–2 Persepolis on aggregate.

Scorers

See also
 2003–04 Iran Pro League
 2003–04 Hazfi Cup

References

External links
Iran Premier League Statistics
RSSSF

Persepolis F.C. seasons
Persepolis